Moritz de Hadeln (born 21 December 1940 in Exeter, Devon, England) is a Swiss documentary film director and photographer, who became a  Film Festival director. He was the founder of Swiss documentary film festival Visions du Réel. He also headed the Locarno International Film Festival from 1972 to 1977, the Berlin International Film Festival from 1980 to 2001 and the Venice International Film Festival in 2002 and 2003. He was also a member of the jury at the 23rd Moscow International Film Festival.

Life
Born in 1940 in Exeter, England, de Hadeln's European family background provided him with a unique education in the Arts. His grandfather Detlev Freiherr von Hadeln was an art historian, his father Harry founded an art edition company in Florence (Italy) and his mother Alexandra Bălăceanu a Romanian immigrant was a painter and sculptor. Moritz de Hadeln after obtaining the French Certificate A level (Baccalauréat), started studying Physics and Chemistry in Paris. He soon joined the film research laboratory Avenue Hoch as an apprentice. After freelancing as a photographer for some years, de Hadeln was given the opportunity to direct his first documentary Le Pèlé in 1963. Followed several years of work with cinematographer Ernest Artaria in Zurich. In 1966, de Hadeln directed his second film Ombres et Mirages and during this same period, worked as a film editor in Zürich together with Yves Allégret and as assistant director at CCC Film Studios in Berlin.

Moritz married Erika von dem Hagen in 1968. In 1969, Moritz de Hadeln and his wife founded the Nyon International Documentary Film Festival (today Visions du Réel film festival) in Switzerland, which he directed until 1979. He assisted Erika when she took over as head of the festival from 1981 to 1993.  In those 25 years, they made Nyon a unique meeting place for documentary filmmaking while discovering many new talents. From 1972 to 1977, de Hadeln headed the Locarno International Film Festival, heralding a new era of international recognition for the event. He gave an original profile to the newly introduced outdoor screening on the Piazza Grande and introduced several sidebar events to broaden the festival's international impact.

In 1979, de Hadeln was invited to head the Berlin International Film Festival. His aim was to establish the German event as one of the “best organized festivals in the world” by introducing among other as first festival in the world the use of computer technology for the data processing of the event. In the early 1980s, in spite of the ongoing Cold War situation in the divided city, he managed to bring East and West together at the festival. Together with Beki Probst, he founded the European Film Market. Tireless world traveller, de Hadeln was one of the first to discover the newly emerging Chinese cinema. As the Berlin Wall fell in 1989 and German unity was restored in 1990, de Hadeln was quick in seizing the opportunity to make the festival one of the most prestigious meeting places of the newly born German capital. After years of detailed planning, in 2000, he successfully managed to relocate the event in the newly rebuilt Potsdamer Platz, the historical heart of the town, while giving to the festival a new corporate identity.

In May 2001, Moritz de Hadeln founded in Berlin together with his wife Erika "de Hadeln & Partners", a company specialising in film consulting and event management. 
In March 2002, as first ever non-Italian, Moritz de Hadeln was invited to head the Venice International Film Festival (the Mostra Internazionale d'Arte Cinematografica) – part of the Venice Biennale. He directed only the two events in 2002 and in 2003. During this short period, while fighting for the independence of the event from external influences, he started together with the president of the Biennale, Franco Bernabè, to modernise its organizational infrastructure while giving it a renewed international prestige.

Finally, early in 2005 he was named Program Director of the short-lived New Montreal FilmFest of 2005, an event wanted by both Federal and Quebec governments. The first and only edition of the event, meant as work in progress, took place from 18 to 25 September 2005. In spite of the limited time available, Moritz de Hadeln and his team were able to deliver a program with over 22 world premières.  But local mismanagement by those in charge of its organisation led regretfully to discontinue the event.

Both for the festivals in Nyon, Locarno and later in Berlin, Moritz de Hadeln together with his wife Erika, were the authors of several landmark retrospectives, among many others The Uzbek cinema (1971), The New Indian Cinema(1972), Canadian 'cinema-direct' 1958–1972 (1976), The 'March of Time' newsreels (1978), Drew Associates 1960–1969 (1981), Selling Switzerland – Marketing Guillaume Tell (1984), Swiss Army Film Unit(1985), Panorama of the South East Asian Cinema (1980) and together with Hans-Joachim Schlegel: Documentary films of the Baltic Soviet Republics (1987/88), Documentary Films of the Armenian Soviet Republic (1989/90), Romania: the documentary films 1898–1990 (1990/91).

Moritz de Hadeln has served on many International Juries among others in the festivals of Karlovy Vary, Venice, Moscow, Montreal, Torino, Tehran, Damascus, Kiev and Yerevan. He is member of the European Film Academy (EFA). Swiss citizen since 1986, Moritz de Hadeln currently resides Gland, Vaud (Switzerland) where he is from 2007 to 2011, as part of the Socialist group, a member of the Town Council. Actually he is a member of Green's local party called "Les Verts de Gland". 2018 his wife Erika died at the age of 77.

Honours
Moritz de Hadeln is Commander in the Ordre des Arts et des Lettres of the French Ministry of Culture (1986),
Commander in the Order of Merit of the Italian Republic (1988)
Officer in the Order of Merits of the Federal Republic of Germany (Bundesverdienstkreuz 1. Klasse) (2000).
He has been awarded the De Curtis Award (1975) for organising the first retrospective of Italian actor "Totò",
the honorary medal Pro Cultura Hungarica(1986)
the Silver Medal of the Slovak Cinematography (1986).
Elected honorary member of the Romanian Film maker's Union
the European Prize of the European Film Forum in Strasbourg as "tribute to a great festival director" (2000),
the Gold medal of the Ministry of Culture of the Russian Federation (2001),
the Gay Teddy Bear (Teddy Award)(2001),
the honorary FIPRESCI prize, jointly with Erika de Hadeln
the honorary Oecumenical Jury prize (2001) jointly with Erika de Hadeln
Tribute medal from the Hollywood Foreign Press Association in Venice, 2002
Honorary Diploma of Appreciation at the 20 Fajr International Film Festival, Tehran (2002)
Honorary Diploma of Appreciation at the Damascus International Film Festival, Syria (2003)
the Armenian Filmmakers Union ANAHIT Award (2006) for the "great effort promoting Armenian Cinema and helping it find its place in the international cinema scene".

References

Bibliography
 de Hadeln, Moritz 20e Festival International du Film Documentaire Nyon, Suisse "C'est du Cinéma", 196 pages (in French only), Ed. Nyon Film Festival,1988. . cf- Dictionnaire historique de la Suisse 
 Frigeri, Riccardo & de Hadeln, Moritz "Cinema e Rivoluzione", Cenobio Rivista bimestrale di Cultura December 1972 Anno XXI, with the transcript of the interventions, among others, of Eric Barnouw, Yvette Biro, Eduardo Bruno, Egon Günter, André Halimi, Nabil Maleh, Roger Manvell, Walter Marti, Henri Storck, Andrei Tarkovsky and Cesare Zavattini, 63 pages (in Italian), Ed. Cenobio, 1972
 de Hadeln, Moritz &  Erika with Schlegel, Hans-Joachim "Documentary Films of the Baltic Soviet Republics", 112 pages (in French, German and English), joint publication of the Nyon and Berlin International Film Festivals, Ed. Nyon Film Festival, 1988.
 de Hadeln, Moritz & Erika with Schlegel, Hans-Joachim Documentary "Films of the Armenian Soviet Republic", 128 pages (in French, German and English), joint publication of the Nyon and Berlin International Film Festivals, Ed. Nyon Film Festival, 1989. 
 de Hadeln, Moritz, de Hadeln, Erika & Schlegel, Hans-Joachim "Romania: the Documentary Films (1898–1990)”, 124 pages (in French, German and English), joint publication of the Nyon and Berlin International Film Festivals, Ed. Nyon Film Festival, 1990. – 
 de Hadeln, Moritz “L'Insupportable Vérité, Chronique de six années turbulantes (1988–1993)”, 132 pages (in French only), Ed. Nyon International Film Festival, 1993 – 
 Jacobsen, Wolfgang 50 years Berlinale, 563 pages (in English, edited also separately in German), Ed. Nicolai, 2000 – 
 Baer, Volker and de Hadeln, Moritz “Closing the Book”, Moritz de Hadeln's Berlinale, 89 pages (bilingual German and English), Ed. Berlin Festspiele GmbH, 2001 –  Catalogue of the Deutsche National Bibliothek   	
 Roddolo, Enrica La Biennale: Arte, polemiche, scandali e storie in Laguna, 262 pages (in Italian), Ed. Marsilio, 2003 – 
 Quarti, Angelo and Caregnato, Antonio Christmas stars 03, 173 pages (in Italian, but mostly photos as tribute to the press photographers of the 2003 Mostra), Ed. ScribaNetStudio.com, 2003

External links 
 Official biography
 Official biography of Erika de Hadeln
 Several documents and tributes
 History of the Locarno Film Festival (1960 to 1980) by Paolo Mereghetti
 History of the Berlin International Film Festival (1980 and following pages)
  Robin Gatto on Moritz de Hadeln in Filmfestival.com
 History of the Venice Film Festival
 

1940 births
Living people
Mass media people from Exeter
Swiss film directors
Swiss photographers
Swiss people of Romanian descent
Commandeurs of the Ordre des Arts et des Lettres
Commanders of the Order of Merit of the Italian Republic
Berlin International Film Festival
Locarno Festival
Venice Film Festival
Officers Crosses of the Order of Merit of the Federal Republic of Germany
Film festival directors